Bangladesh Betar, or BB is the state-owned radio broadcaster of Bangladesh, initially established as the Dhaka station of All India Radio in 1939. It was later made part of Radio Pakistan. After the independence of the country in 1971, Radio Pakistan ceased transmissions there and the Swadhin Bangla Betar Kendra was renamed to Bangladesh Betar, which took full control of all radio stations in the country at the time.

Bangladesh Betar is a sister service to Bangladesh Television, which is also state-owned. It operates several AM and FM stations around Bangladesh. It also broadcasts in six languages, including Bengali, to listeners in the country and overseas. Hosne Ara Talukdar is the Director General of Bangladesh Betar.

History

Early years 
Radio transmission in the region now known as Bangladesh commenced in Dhaka on 16 December 1939 during British rule, as a part of All India Radio. Initially, the station was located at the Nazimuddin Road in Old Dhaka. Its maximum transmission range was 45 kilometre. Leila Arjumand Banu performed on the first day of broadcasting. After the territory eventually fell into Pakistani rule in 1947, the station in Dhaka became a part of Radio Pakistan. In 1954, broadcasting started in Rajshahi. On 8 September 1960, the radio station was moved to a modern office in Shahbag with six professional studios. More regional stations were opened in Sylhet in 1961, Savar in 1963, Rangpur in 1967 and in Khulna in 1970.

Independence of Bangladesh 
Radio played an important role during the Bangladesh Liberation War of 1971. On 26 March 1971, the broadcasting centre of Radio Pakistan was used to transmit a declaration of independence, which was picked up by a Japanese ship in Chittagong Harbor and retransmitted. On 26 March 1971, as the Pakistan Army took over the radio station in Dhaka, the Swadhin Bangla Biplobi Betar Kendra clandestine radio station was established in a two-storey building in Kalurghat, constantly broadcasting Sheikh Mujibur Rahman's call for independence. The station was later renamed to Swadhin Bangla Betar Kendra (Independent Bengal Radio Station). Because of heavy shelling, the station had to be relocated several times. It was first relocated to Tripura on 3 April, and ultimately moved to Kolkata on 25 May, from where it would broadcast until the end of the war.

Post independence 
On 6 December, the Swadhin Bangla Betar Kendra was renamed to Bangladesh Betar, which ultimately replaced Radio Pakistan in Bangladesh. The radio broadcaster was renamed to Radio Bangladesh in 1975, but was reverted back to Bangladesh Betar in 1996. Its current headquarters were completed in 1983 at National Broadcasting House, Agargaon. Bangladesh Betar was the sole radio broadcaster in Bangladesh until the establishment of Radio Metrowave in 1999, which itself was shut down on 27 June 2005. In January 2020, the programming of Bangladesh Betar began to be distributed to India via All India Radio's stations in Kolkata and Agartala, and also on AIR's app.

Stations
Schedule MW

Schedule FM

See also

 Telecommunications in Bangladesh

References

External links
 Official Website
 Bangladesh Betar Traffic Wing, Traffic FM 88.8

International broadcasters
Radio stations in Bangladesh
Radio stations established in 1939
Mass media in Dhaka
1939 establishments in India
Ministry of Information and Broadcasting (Bangladesh)